Sévère D'Aoust (or Daoust) born in Vaudreuil, Lower Canada in the early 19th century, established a village in the region of Bearbrook in 1854. He later gave part of his land for the construction of a Roman Catholic church in Sarsfield, Ontario in 1886.

Sévère D'Aoust and his wife Odille Adèle St-Denis were Québec farmers before the Roman Catholic bishops from Montréal encouraged farmers to colonize the Eastern area of Ontario. The couple settled in Cumberland Township.

References

French Quebecers
Franco-Ontarian people
Canadian Roman Catholics
Settlers of the National Capital Region (Canada)
Year of birth unknown
Year of death unknown